Harrison Luther Mata'afa Hansen (born 26 October 1985) is a professional rugby league footballer who plays as a  and  for Toulouse Olympique in the Betfred Championship. He has played for Samoa and New Zealand at international level.

He has also played for the Wigan Warriors, Salford Red Devils, Leigh Centurions and the Widnes Vikings in the Super League. During his time with Wigan, he won two Super League Grand Finals and two Challenge Cups.

Background
Hansen was born in Auckland, New Zealand.

Early life
Hansen is the son of the rugby league footballer for Salford and Swinton, Shane Hansen. He is a product of the Folly Lane ARLFC who play at the Blue Ribbon Field, Pendlebury. Hansen attended the same Swinton school, Moorside High School, as Manchester United's Ryan Giggs. He is of Samoan, Chinese, and Scottish descent.

Hansen impressed in Wigan's Academy setup and was signed on a new two-year deal in July 2003. Head coach of the time Stuart Raper said: "Harrison has impressed me this season in the Under 21s and he is another quality young player to come through the ranks joining the likes of Luke Robinson, Gareth Hock and Kevin Brown."

Rugby Executive Dean Bell commented, "Harrison possess all the right qualities to become a regular first grade player, he has come through our scholarship system and has been outstanding in our Under 21 side this season. His signing reinforces the Wigan club's ongoing commitment in developing and promoting our young players."

Club career
Hansen continued his development by being promoted to the first team setup for Super League IX. He made his first team début in Terry O'Connor's Testimonial match against London Broncos. He went on to make six substitute appearances in the season.

In 2005, Hansen became a more established first team regular in the second row, partly due to the departure of Andy Farrell, and injuries to Sean O'Loughlin and Gareth Hock. He signed a new 2-year contract with the club in April 2005. He agreed a new 4-year deal with Wigan on 14 November 2006 keeping him at the club until 2010.

Hansen played in the 2010 Super League Grand Final victory over St. Helens at Old Trafford.

Hansen's 2011's Super League XVI started with a try against St Helens during the season-opening Magic Weekend event, which was followed up with another try against Bradford Bulls the week after. Hansen scored again in Round 3's match against Salford, however in Round 12 during a victory against Wakefield Trinity, he suffered an injury which would keep him out of action for at least a month.

Hansen played as a  forward in the 2011 Challenge Cup Final 28–18 victory over the Leeds Rhinos at Wembley Stadium.

Hansen played in the 2013 Challenge Cup Final victory over Hull F.C. at Wembley Stadium. He also played in the 2013 Super League Grand Final victory over the Warrington Wolves at Old Trafford.

In 2013, Hansen signed for Salford Red Devils for an undisclosed fee, signing a four-year contract. Upon signing, he claimed it was the influence of Marwan Koukash that meant he was signing, and that joining Salford would be "a great new challenge. I have achieved everything I could at Wigan and had a great time there. I'm not just coming to Salford for an easy ride".

Toulouse Olympique 
On 18 September 2019, Widnes announced that Hansen had left them and signed a one-year contract with Toulouse for the 2020 season.

On 10 October 2021, Hansen played for Toulouse in their victory over Featherstone in the Million Pound Game which saw the club promoted to the Super League for the first time in their history. Three days later Toulouse announced that Hansen had signed a one-year contract extension until the end of the 2022 season.

Representative career
Eligible for England, New Zealand and Samoa, Hansen represented England at youth level. However, in 2006 he was called up into the New Zealand squad for the mid season international against Great Britain. He later switched his allegiance to Samoa, and made his Samoa début in 2007.

Hansen was part of the Samoan squad for the 2008 Rugby League World Cup.

In 2009 Hansen was named as part of the Samoan side for the Pacific Cup.

Following the withdrawal of Roy Asotasi, Hansen was named Samoa's captain for the 2013 Rugby League World Cup. However just before the tournament kicked off, he suffered an injury, forcing him out of the tournament. He handed the captaincy over to Iosia Soliola.

References

External links

Leigh Centurions profile
Leigh profile
(archived by web.archive.org) Official Harrison Hansen Profile
 Harrison Hansen Wigan Career Page on the Wigan RL Fansite.
WARRIORS PROP OPTS FOR SAMOA
(archived by web.archive.org) Hansen Agree New Wigan Deal

1985 births
Living people
Leigh Leopards captains
Leigh Leopards players
New Zealand national rugby league team players
New Zealand people of Chinese descent
New Zealand sportspeople of Samoan descent
New Zealand people of Scottish descent
New Zealand rugby league players
People educated at Moorside High School
Rugby league locks
Rugby league players from Auckland
Rugby league second-rows
Salford Red Devils captains
Salford Red Devils players
Samoa national rugby league team players
Samoan people of Chinese descent
Samoan people of Scottish descent
Samoan rugby league players
Toulouse Olympique captains
Toulouse Olympique players
Widnes Vikings players
Wigan Warriors players